Viscount of Stormont is a title in the Peerage of Scotland. It was created in 1621 by James VI for his friend and helper Sir David Murray who had saved him from the attack of the Earl of Gowrie in 1600. Murray had already been created Lord Scone, also in the Peerage of Scotland in 1605. The peerages were created with remainder to 1) Sir Mungo Murray, fourth son of John Murray, 1st Earl of Tullibardine, failing which to 2) John Murray, who was created Earl of Annandale in 1625, and failing which to 3) Sir Andrew Murray, who was created Lord Balvaird in 1641. Lord Stormont died childless and was succeeded according to the special remainder by  the aforementioned Mungo Murray, the second Viscount. He died without male issue and was succeeded according to the special remainder by James Murray, 2nd Earl of Annandale, who now also became the third Viscount Stormont. He was the son of the aforementioned John Murray, 1st Earl of Annandale. He was also childless and on his death in 1658 the earldom became extinct.

He was succeeded in the lordship of Scone and the viscountcy of Stormont according to the special remainder by David Murray, 2nd Lord Balvaird, who became the fourth Viscount Stormont (see the Lord Balvaird for earlier history of this title). He was the son of the aforementioned Andrew Murray, 1st Lord Balvaird. On his death the titles passed to his son, the fifth Viscount. His second son, James Murray was Member of Parliament for Dumfriesshire from 1711 to 1713, and later supported the Jacobite rising of 1715. In 1721 he was created Earl of Dunbar, Viscount of Drumcairn and Lord Halldykes in the Jacobite peerage. His third son was the prominent lawyer and judge William Murray, 1st Earl of Mansfield and Mansfield. In 1793 Lord Stormont's grandson, the seventh Viscount, succeeded his uncle as second Earl of Mansfield according to a special remainder in the letters patent. For further history of the titles, see the Earl of Mansfield and Mansfield.

Viscounts of Stormont (1621)
David Murray, 1st Viscount of Stormont (d. 1631)
Mungo Murray, 2nd Viscount of Stormont (d. 1642)
James Murray, 2nd Earl of Annandale, 3rd Viscount of Stormont  (d. 1658)
David Murray, 4th Viscount of Stormont (c. 1636–1668)
David Murray, 5th Viscount of Stormont (c. 1665–1731)
David Murray, 6th Viscount of Stormont (c. 1689–1748)
David Murray, 7th Viscount of Stormont (1727–1796) (succeeded as Earl of Mansfield in 1793)
For further succession see the Earl of Mansfield and Mansfield

Notes

References
Kidd, Charles & Williamson, David (editors). Debrett's Peerage and Baronetage (1990 edition). New York: St Martin's Press, 1990, 

DNB article on the first Viscount

Viscountcies in the Peerage of Scotland
1621 establishments in Scotland
Noble titles created in 1621